Elections to Erewash Borough Council were held on 3 May 1979 as part of nationwide local elections.

Overall results

Erewash Borough Council - Results by Ward

Breadsall and Morley

Breaston

Cotmanhay

Dale Abbey

Derby Road East

Derby Road West

Draycott

Ilkeston Central

Ilkeston North

Ilkeston South

Kirk Hallam North

Kirk Hallam South

Little Eaton

Long Eaton Central

Nottingham Road

Ockbrook and Borrowash

Old Park

Sandiacre North

Sandiacre South

Sawley

Stanley

Victoria

West Hallam

Wilsthorpe

References

1979
1979 English local elections
1970s in Derbyshire